Donald Robertson Thomson MacMillan (5 January 1928 – 19 November 2004) was an Australian middle-distance runner. He competed in the 800 metres at the 1952 and 1956 Summer Olympics, but failed to reach the finals. In 1952, he placed ninth in the final of the 1500 m event. At the British Empire and Commonwealth Games, MacMillan finished seventh over 1 mile in 1950, and won a bronze medal in the 4×440 yd relay in 1954.

References

1928 births
2004 deaths
Athletes (track and field) at the 1952 Summer Olympics
Athletes (track and field) at the 1956 Summer Olympics
Australian male middle-distance runners
Olympic athletes of Australia
Place of birth missing
Commonwealth Games medallists in athletics
Commonwealth Games bronze medallists for Australia
Athletes (track and field) at the 1950 British Empire Games
Athletes (track and field) at the 1954 British Empire and Commonwealth Games
Medallists at the 1954 British Empire and Commonwealth Games